The High Council of Justice refers to:
High Council of Justice (Albania)
High Council of Justice (Belgium)
High Council of Justice (Ukraine)